Democratic and Popular (Démocrate et populaire) is a Christian-democratic and centrist faction within the Union for a Popular Movement (UMP).

Its members include Philippe Douste-Blazy, Pierre Méhaignerie and Jacques Barrot, all three former members of Democratic Force (FD) and then of the Union for French Democracy (UDF).

External links
Official website

Political party factions in France
Factions and associate parties of the Union for a Popular Movement